Doellingeria is a genus of flowering plants in the family Asteraceae. It contains species formerly included in Aster but now considered to be a distinct genus. They are known commonly as tall flat-topped asters or whitetops.

There is still some disagreement as to which species should be included in Doellingeria. Some authorities include up to 10 or 11 species in Doellingeria, but phylogenetic analyses suggest that any Asian plants in the genus should be classified in Aster, making Doellengeria an endemic North American genus. A fourth is now treated as Oclemena reticulata.

Doellingeria as it is now defined is a genus of perennial herbs growing from rhizomes or woody bases. The unbranched stems grow erect and the tallest can reach  in height. The alternately arranged leaves have smooth edges and are sometimes woolly or rough-haired. The flower heads are a few millimeters long and contain 2 to 10 white ray florets, sometimes more. The disc florets are light yellow and the lobes at the tips may spread or curl. The fruit is a cypsela with a pappus of three rings of white or tan bristles and an outer ring of scales.

 Species
 Doellingeria dimorphophylla (Franch. & Sav.) G.L.Nesom - Japan
 Doellingeria infirma (Michx.) Greene eastern USA (from Alabama to Massachusetts)
 Doellingeria komonoensis (Makino) G.L.Nesom - Japan
 Doellingeria longipetiolata (C.C.Chang) G.L.Nesom - Sichuan in China
 Doellingeria rugulosa (Maxim.) G.L.Nesom - Japan
 Doellingeria scabra (Thunb.) Nees - China, Japan, Korea, Russia (Irkutsk, Amur Oblast, Khabarovsk, Primorye)
 Doellingeria sekimotoi (Makino) G.L.Nesom - Japan
 Doellingeria sericocarpoides Small - southeastern USA (Texas to Maryland; a few populations in New York and New Jersey)
 Doellingeria sohayakiensis (Koidz.) G.L.Nesom - Japan
 Doellingeria umbellata (Mill.) Nees - USA (Florida to Maine + North Dakota); Canada (Alberta to Newfoundland)

References

 
Asteraceae genera